Rhythm and Booze is a live acoustic album by Authority Zero. It was released by Suburban Noize Records in February 2005, and re-released on June 27, 2006. Except for "Paddy On The Railway" and "Broken Dreams," this album features acoustic versions of songs from Authority Zero's earlier releases, A Passage In Time and Andiamo.

The final release of this record features slightly different edits from the original release.

Track listing
 "Intro" – 3:55
 "A Passage in Time" – 3:52
 "Retreat" – 4:54
 "Siempre Loco" – 3:28
 "Find Your Way" – 4:17
 "Painted Windows" – 3:58
 "Mesa Town" – 2:45
 "One More Minute" – 6:55
 "Superbitch" – 25:56
 "Revolution" – 3:56
 "Paddy on the Railway" – 4:06
 "Over Seasons" – 4:11
 "Everyday" – 34:06
 "PCH-82" – 4:44
 "Broken Dreams" – 54:27

References

2005 live albums
Authority Zero albums
Suburban Noize Records live albums